D'Yves Air Pub is a French aircraft manufacturer based in La Chapelle-en-Vexin, founded by Yves Hélary. The company specializes in the design and manufacture of paramotors and powered parachutes in the form of kits for amateur construction and ready-to-fly aircraft for the US FAR 103 Ultralight Vehicles rules and the European Fédération Aéronautique Internationale microlight category.

Hélary has been singled out for his incremental design innovations and his individual customer service.

The company has a full line of paramotors, including the now-discontinued D'Yves Yvasion 2000 and the current production Mikalight and Titanox. Current powered parachute models include the Single-Seater Trike, Airmax Double-Seater Trike and the Double-Seater Trike.

Aircraft

References

External links

Aircraft manufacturers of France
Ultralight aircraft
Powered parachutes
Paramotors
Companies based in Île-de-France